Adult Contemporary is a chart published by Billboard ranking the top-performing songs in the United States in the adult contemporary music (AC) market.  In 2013, 11 different songs topped the chart in 52 issues of the magazine, based on weekly airplay data from radio stations compiled by Nielsen Broadcast Data Systems.

On the first chart of the year, the number one position was held by Rod Stewart with "Let It Snow! Let It Snow! Let It Snow!", the song's fifth consecutive week at number one.  The following week, it was displaced from the top spot by "Somebody That I Used to Know" by Gotye featuring Kimbra, which returned to the top of the chart having had a lengthy run at number one the previous year.  The song was replaced atop the chart in the issue of Billboard dated February 2 by "Home" by Phillip Phillips, the winner of the eleventh season of American Idol.  The song, originally released the previous June, took more than 20 weeks to reach the top of the AC chart, but once it got to the top it held the number one position for 12 weeks, the longest unbroken run of the year.  It went on to become the biggest-selling "coronation song" released by an American Idol winner to date.  Phillips returned to the top of the chart later in the year with "Gone, Gone, Gone", making him one of only two artists to achieve more than one chart-topper during the year, the other being Pink.

In October, actress Anna Kendrick topped the chart with "Cups (Pitch Perfects When I'm Gone)".  The song became a surprise radio hit when the one-minute fragment which she performed in the film Pitch Perfect, accompanying herself only by clapping and tapping a plastic cup, was remixed and released as a full-length single.  It topped the AC chart for three weeks before being displaced by Katy Perry's "Roar".  Having begun with a Christmas song at number one, the year ended with another atop the chart, as Kelly Clarkson's "Underneath the Tree" held the top spot for the final three weeks of 2013.

Chart history

See also
2013 in music
List of artists who reached number one on the U.S. Adult Contemporary chart

References

2013
Number-one adult contemporary singles
United States Adult Contemporary